Patrick Carroll "Pat" Hewson (2 June 1926 - 28 March 2017) was an English former footballer who played as a full-back.

Hewson played in The Football League for Gateshead between 1953 and 1958 after a spell at West Bromwich Albion. He was also on the books at Northern League side Crook Town earlier in his career.

Sources

1926 births
2017 deaths
Footballers from Gateshead
English footballers
Association football defenders
Crook Town A.F.C. players
West Bromwich Albion F.C. players
Gateshead F.C. players
Northern Football League players
English Football League players